The 2012 Copa Sudamericana Finals were the final two-legged tie that decided the winner of the 2012 Copa Sudamericana, the 11th edition of the Copa Sudamericana, South America's secondary international club football tournament organized by CONMEBOL. The matches were played on 5 and 12 December 2012 between Tigre of Argentina and São Paulo of Brazil.

Qualified teams

Road to the finals

Rules
The final is played over two legs; home and away. The higher seeded team plays the second leg at home. The team that accumulates the most points —three for a win, one for a draw, zero for a loss— after the two legs is crowned the champion. Should the two teams be tied on points after the second leg, the team with the best goal difference wins. If the two teams have equal goal difference, the away goals rule is not applied, unlike the rest of the tournament. Extra time is played, which consists of two 15-minute halves. If the tie is still not broken, a penalty shootout ensues according to the Laws of the Game.

Matches

First leg

Second leg

See also
2013 Recopa Sudamericana
2013 Suruga Bank Championship

References

External links
Official webpage 

Copa Sudamericana Finals
Finals
Copa Sudamericana Finals 2012
Copa Sudamericana Finals 2012
Football in Buenos Aires